Gandhi's death may refer to:
 Assassination of Mahatma Gandhi
 Assassination of Indira Gandhi
 Assassination of Rajiv Gandhi